Charles Montaland (14 February 1910 – 10 February 1985) was a French organist, composer, improviser, and music teacher, born in Lyon.

He studied music composition with René Leibowitz and orchestration with Manuel Rosenthal.

For 30 years he taught music at Lyon music conservatory (fr).

He taught music to the French film music composer Pierre Yves Lenik.

A street in the neighbourhood of Villeurbanne bears his name.

A choir bears his name. Ensemble Charles Montaland

References 

Charles Montaland (Biography in French)

1910 births
1987 deaths
Musicians from Lyon
20th-century French composers
French classical organists
French male organists
French music educators
20th-century organists
20th-century French male musicians
Male classical organists